The IIFA Award for Best Female Playback Singer given to chosen by the viewers and the winner is announced at the ceremony. The first recipient of the award was Alka Yagnik, who was honoured at the 1st IIFA Awards in the year 2000. The most recent recipient of the award is Asees Kaur, who was honoured at the 22nd IIFA Awards in the year 2022.

Superlatives

Award was introduced in 2000 and records after 2000 till date are as follows.

Shreya Ghoshal with 8 wins, hold the record for most awards in this category. Alka Yagnik, Sunidhi Chauhan and Kanika Kapoor have won the award two times. Shreya Ghoshal won the award in a record of three consecutive years (2012–14).

Shreya Ghoshal's four nominations out of the five nominations in 2008 also give her the record for most number of Best Female Playback Singer nominations in a single year. Shreya Ghoshal holds the record of getting nominated for consecutively 11 years from 2006 till 2016, resulting in 17 nominations and 5 wins.

Most Wins

Multiple Nominees

List of Winners
† - indicates the performance also won the Filmfare Award‡ - indicates the performance was also nominated for the Filmfare Award

2000s

2010s

2020s

See also
 List of music awards honoring women
 IIFA Award for Best Male Playback
 IIFA Awards

References

External links
 Official site

International Indian Film Academy Awards
Music awards honoring women
Indian music awards